The 2016–17 Central Arkansas Sugar Bears basketball team represented the University of Central Arkansas during the 2016–17 NCAA Division I women's basketball season. The Sugar Bears were led by fifth year head coach Sandra Rushing and played their home games at the Farris Center as members of the Southland Conference. They finished the season 26–5, 16–2 tied for first place in conference play. They were champions of the Southland women's tournament. They received an invitation to the NCAA tournament marking their second consecutive NCAA tournament appearance.  Their season ended in the first round with a loss to the Texas Longhorns.

Schedule
Sources:

|-
!colspan=9 style=| Non-conference regular Schedule

|-
!colspan=9 style=| Southland Conference Schedule

|-
!colspan=9 style=| Southland Women's Tournament

|-
!colspan=9 style=| WBI

See also
2016–17 Central Arkansas Bears basketball team

References

Central Arkansas Sugar Bears basketball seasons
Central Arkansas
Central Arkansas Bears basketball team
Central Arkansas Bears basketball team
Central Arkansas